The Commandant-General of the RAF Regiment (CG RAF Regt) is the Royal Air Force commander of the RAF Regiment.  The post was established in January 1942 immediately prior to the creation of the RAF Regiment.  The first two holders of the post were  major-generals in the British Army.  From 1948 onward, the Commandant-General has been an RAF officer of air rank.  These officers all held the rank of air vice-marshal until 1993 when the post was downgraded to air commodore. In 2022, the position was more upgraded to Air Vice-Marshal with the appoint of AVM Michael Smeath.

Commandants-general

References

Royal Air Force Regiment
Royal Air Force appointments